Sand Run may refer to:

Sand Run, Ohio, an unincorporated community in Hocking County
Sand Run, West Virginia, an unincorporated community in Upshur County